Denis Gremelmayr was the defending champion but decided not to participate.Steve Darcis won in the final 6–3, 4–6, 6–2 against Marsel İlhan.

Seeds

Draw

Finals

Top half

Bottom half

References
 Main Draw
 Qualifying Draw

The Hague Open - Singles
2011 Singles